The World Orienteering Championships (or WOC for short) is an annual orienteering event organized by the International Orienteering Federation. The first World Championships was held in Fiskars, Finland in 1966. They were held biennially up to 2003 (with the exception of 1978 and 1979). Since 2003, competitions have been held annually. Participating nations have to be members of the International Orienteering Federation (IOF).

Originally, there were only two competitions: an individual race and a relay. In 1991, a short distance race (roughly 20–25 minutes) was added and a sprint race was added in 2001. The middle distance (roughly 30–35 minutes) replaced the short distance in 2003. In 2014, a sprint relay was added with two men and two women participating and with starting order woman-man-man-woman.

History
The IOF was founded on 21 May 1961 at a Congress held in Copenhagen, Denmark by the orienteering national federations of Bulgaria, Czechoslovakia, Denmark, the Federal Republic of Germany, the German Democratic Republic, Finland, Hungary, Norway, Sweden and Switzerland. Their main goal was to standardize the sport and streamline international competition rules. A group of people work with these tasks, and at the 1963 IOF Congress, the work was approved and a technical committee was created. This led to the first international orienteering competition; the 1962 European Championships in Løten, Norway. The first European Orienteering Championships (EOC) consisted of only one competition; individual. In the following EOC, in Le Brassus, Switzerland, the relay event was added to the competition program. These two EOCs are considered forerunners to the first World Orienteering Championships in 1966.

In 2019, the World Orienteering Championships was split into two events: Sprint WOC (even-numbered years) consisting of sprint events only, and Forest WOC (odd-numbered years) consisting of forest events only. 

Due to the COVID-19 pandemic the first sprint only WOC 2020 was cancelled. Instead Sprint and Sprint Relay was added to the WOC program for 2021 following the old championship program, otherwise there would not have been sprint comptitions in the world championships for four years (2019-2022). In 2022 the first sprint only WOC was organized in Denmark, and the new competition format Knockout Sprint made its debut.

Format
The competition format has changed several times. From the beginning in 1966, the World Championships consisted of only two competitions: an individual race and a relay. In 1991, a short distance race (roughly 20–25 minutes) was added and a sprint race was added in 2001. The middle distance (roughly 30–35 minutes) replaced the short distance in 2003. On IOF's 23rd congress in Lausanne in 2012, it was decided that a sprint relay event would be added in the 2014 World Championships in Italy. The sprint relay is competed in urban areas and consists of four-orienteer mixed-gender teams with starting order woman-man-man-woman.

Current competition format
The current championship events are:

Event timeline

Venues

Multiple winners

Men

Boldface denotes active athletes and highest medal count among all athletes (including these who not included in these tables) per type.

Women

Boldface denotes active athletes and highest medal count among all athletes (including these who not included in these tables) per type.

Mixed

Sprint Relay

All-time medal table
(Updated after WOC 2022)

See also
List of World Orienteering Championships medalists (men)
List of World Orienteering Championships medalists (women)
List of World Orienteering Championships medalists (mixed events)

References

External links
 International Orienteering Federation
 World Orienteering Championships, senior statistics 1966–2005

WOC

 World Orienteering Championships 1968
 World Orienteering Championships 2004
 World Orienteering Championships 2005
 World Orienteering Championships 2006
 World Orienteering Championships 2007
 World Orienteering Championships 2008

 World Orienteering Championships 2009
 World Orienteering Championships 2010
 World Orienteering Championships 2011
 World Orienteering Championships 2012
 World Orienteering Championships 2013
 World Orienteering Championships 2014

 World Orienteering Championships 2015
 World Orienteering Championships 2016
 World Orienteering Championships 2017
 World Orienteering Championships 2018
 World Orienteering Championships 2019
 World Orienteering Championships 2020